Veasna is a given name of Cambodian origin meaning "future" or “destiny”. As with most Cambodian names the family name is followed by the given name.

Veasna may refer to:

 Khem Veasna, Cambodian politician, the founder of League for Democracy Party
 Anthony Veasna So, Cambodian-American writer
 Soun Veasna, Cambodian footballer